Ljubljana–Zagreb–Beograd, released in 1993, is an album by Slovenian industrial group Laibach, recorded in 1982. It is named after three capitals of three former Yugoslav republics - Ljubljana (Slovenia), Zagreb (Croatia) and Beograd (Belgrade) (Serbia). It is predominantly a live album. The cover features Tomaž Hostnik, who committed suicide in 1982, the bleeding comes from a bottle thrown at him at that night's show.

Track listing
 "Intro" (live) – :32
 "Unsere Geschichte" (live) (Laibach) – 1:08
 "Rdeči molk (Red Silence)" (live) (Laibach) – 1:46
 "Siemens" (Laibach) – 6:14
 "Smrt za smrt (Death for Death)" (live) (Laibach) – 3:26
 "Država (The State)" (live) (Laibach) – 6:13
 "Zavedali so se — Poparjen je odšel I (They Have Been Aware — Scalded He Left I)" (live) (Laibach) – 1:52
 "Delo in disciplina (Work and Discipline)" (live) (Laibach) – 3:51
 "Tito-Tito" (live) (a version of Zequinha de Abreu's Tico-Tico no Fubá) – 2:12
 "Ostati zvesti naši preteklošti — Poparjen je odšel II (To Stay Faithful To Our Past — Scalded He Left II)" (live) (Laibach) – 3:25
 "Tovarna C19 (Factory C19)" (live) (Laibach) – 2:06
 "STT (Machine Factory Trbovlje)" (live) (Laibach) – :31
 "Sveti Urh (Saint Urch)" (live) (Laibach) – 2:01
 "Država (The State)" (Studio Version) (Laibach) – 4:52
 "Cari amici soldati/Jaruzelski/Država/Svoboda (Dear Soldier Friends/Jaruzelski/The State/Freedom)" (Laibach) – 29:29

Laibach (band) albums
1993 live albums